Fake Four is an independent record label based in New Haven, Connecticut. It was founded by brothers  Ceschi and David Ramos in 2008.

According to an interview with Ceschi on Ugsmag.com, the Ramos brothers started Fake Four with help from Grimm Image Records in San Bernardino, California and Squids Eye Recording Collective in Dayton, Ohio as an outlet to release and distribute their personal music projects and those of their friends. Since the initial release This Up Here by David Ramos, Fake Four Inc. has been a self-sufficient label.

Style
Fake Four Inc. does not adhere to genre specifications. Brett Uddenberg of URB praised the label for pushing the boundaries of indie rap. Chris Faraone of The Phoenix wrote: "you heard it here first: Fake Four is the most important label in progressive hip-hop right now."

History
The first full-length release on Fake Four Inc. came with This Up Here by David Ramos on May 20, 2008. It is a self-published album by co-founder of the label and Modern Drummer magazine's Top 10 Progressive drummers. and XLR8R.

In 2010, Fake Four Inc. became official label partners with Circle Into Square in Portland, Oregon and took on production and distribution duties for the smaller like-minded label. Fake Four Inc. is exclusively distributed by Sonic Unyon in Canada and Redeye Distribution worldwide. 

In 2013, an Indiegogo campaign for Fake Four Inc. raised over $52,000 to cover manufacturing costs and operating expenses.

Fake Four Inc. has released albums by Astronautalis, Blue Sky Black Death, Boy in Static, Busdriver, Electric President, K-the-I???, Myka 9, Noah23. Nearly all releases on the label have placed on CMJ charts, including Vessel by Dark Time Sunshine on #2 CMJ Hip Hop ranking and Lawson Graham by Factor and Owl Hours by Awol One & Factor on #3 CMJ Hip Hop showings.

Fake Four Inc. has also been noted for their intra-label collaborations and artists signed to the label have self-booked tours through the United States, Canada and Europe.

Artists
According to their site as of 2017, Fake Four Inc.'s current promoted artists include
 Andy the Doorbum & Justin Aswell
 Bleubird
 Ceschi
 Factor
 Gregory Pepper & His Problems
 Onry Ozzborn
 Zavala
Artists still on the roster include
 Awol One
 Bike for Three!
 Blue Sky Black Death
 Boy in Static
 Busdriver
 Cars & Trains
 Child Actor
 Dark Time Sunshine
 David Ramos
 Grayskul
 Louis Logic
 Moodie Black
 Open Mike Eagle
 Paranoid Castle
 Sadistik
 Sister Crayon
 Tommy V
Artists now archived include
 Astronautalis
 Common Grackle
 Electric President
 greencarpetedstairs
 K-the-I???
 Kaigen
 Mad Gregs
 Mic King & Chum
 Myka 9
 Nathaniel Motte
 Noah23
 Sixo
 Sole
 Sole and the Skyrider Band
Artists with one time releases on the label include 
 Delby L
 Hired Hand
 Lord Fowl
 Pretend You're Happy
 Ron Contour

See also 
 List of record labels
 Underground hip hop
 Pacific Northwest hip hop

References

External links
 Official website
 Fake Four Inc. on Discogs

 American independent record labels
 Companies based in New Haven, Connecticut
 Experimental music record labels
 Hip hop record labels
 Record labels established in 2008